The  and  are electric multiple unit (EMU) train types operated by the private railway operator Seibu Railway in Japan.

Original 101 series
The 101 series began service in 1969, in conjunction with the opening of the Seibu Chichibu Line.

New 101 series and 301 series
The New 101 series features changes in design. The 301 series is based on the New 101 series, and were formed as eight-car sets.

Resale
The Chichibu Railway 6000 series trains were rebuilt from former Seibu New 101 series trains. Sangi Railway operates former New 101 series trains as Sangi Railway 751 series. Former Seibu New 101 series trains were also transferred to Ryutetsu, becoming Ryutetsu 5000 series trains.

Livery variations
In 2018, one set received a livery resembling the Ohmi Railway 100 series. Other livery variations include a set in Izuhakone Railway livery, and a set in red and beige livery.

Preserved examples
KuHa 1150: used as a library room at the Kumegawa Train Library in Higashimurayama, Tokyo.
KuHa 1224: preserved at Yokoze yard.
KuHa 1262: exhibited outside the MetLife Dome in Tokorozawa, Saitama.

References

External links

 Seibu Railway website 

Electric multiple units of Japan
101 series

1500 V DC multiple units of Japan